Lakes College is a further education institute located at Lillyhall, West Cumbria, England, between the towns of Workington and Whitehaven.

The college offers courses to students from Allerdale, Copeland and the surrounding areas. These courses include NVQs, BTECs, Diplomas and Access courses, as well as HNCs, HNDs and Foundation Degrees.

The college is a sponsor of Energy Coast UTC in Workington.

In 2018 the northern hub of the National College for Nuclear was launched at the college, funded by £7.5 million from the Department for Education. The college is expected to service the building and operation of new build nuclear power plants, for example the nearby proposed Moorside Nuclear Power Station.

References

External links
 Lakes College West Cumbria homepage

Further education colleges in Cumbria